Verel-Pragondran is a commune in the Savoie department in the Auvergne-Rhône-Alpes region in south-eastern France. It is part of the urban area of Chambéry.

Inhabitant are called in French Devrai-Gondraniers or Devrai-Gondranières.

Geography 

Verel-Pragondran is a small village of a bit more than 400 persons.
Its surface area is 6,53 km², at an altitude between 432m et 1500m.

Verel-Pragondran is located near Chambéry (5 km).

See also
Communes of the Savoie department

References

Communes of Savoie